Bruno de Araújo Dybal (born 3 March 1994) is a Brazilian professional footballer who plays as a attacking midfielder for Indonesian club Persikabo 1973. Previously he played for Palmeiras, Oeste, Ventforet Kofu and Figueirense on loan.

Club career
Born in São Paulo, Dybal joined Palmeiras youth setup in 2005, after starting it out at Portuguesa. He made his first team – and Série A – debut on 18 November 2012, coming on as late substitute for Mazinho in a 1–1 away draw against Flamengo. Dybal appeared in two further matches for Verdão, who suffered relegation. On 3 January 2014, after a year without a single appearance, he was loaned to Oeste until the end of the year.

Dybal moved to Ventforet Kofu on loan on 28 December 2014, after making no appearances for Oeste. After playing only one game, his loan was cut short due to injury. On 29 June 2015, Dybal was loaned to fellow top tier club Figueirense, until February 2016.

On 6 January 2020, he joined Indonesian Liga 1 club, Persiraja Banda Aceh.

Career statistics
.

Honours
Palmeiras
Campeonato Brasileiro Série B (1): 2013

References

External links

1994 births
Living people
People from Guarulhos
Brazilian footballers
Association football midfielders
Campeonato Brasileiro Série A players
J1 League players
Liga Portugal 2 players
A Lyga players
Bruno Dybal
Liga 1 (Indonesia) players
UAE First Division League players
Sociedade Esportiva Palmeiras players
Oeste Futebol Clube players
Ventforet Kofu players
Figueirense FC players
Gil Vicente F.C. players
FK Sūduva Marijampolė players
Bruno Dybal
Persiraja Banda Aceh players
Masfout Club players
Persikabo 1973 players
Brazilian expatriate footballers
Brazilian expatriate sportspeople in Japan
Brazilian expatriate sportspeople in Portugal
Brazilian expatriate sportspeople in Lithuania
Brazilian expatriate sportspeople in Thailand
Brazilian expatriate sportspeople in Indonesia
Brazilian expatriate sportspeople in the United Arab Emirates
Expatriate footballers in Japan
Expatriate footballers in Portugal
Expatriate footballers in Lithuania
Expatriate footballers in Thailand
Expatriate footballers in Indonesia
Expatriate footballers in the United Arab Emirates
Footballers from São Paulo (state)